Stalham is a market town and civil parish on the River Ant in the English county of Norfolk, in East Anglia.
For the purposes of local government, it falls within the district of North Norfolk. The parts of the parish lying adjacent to the river fall into the executive area of the Broads Authority.

The towns name probably means, 'fish pool homestead/village' but perhaps, 'hemmed-in land with a fish pool'.

Stalham was once served by a railway station until it was closed in 1959. The nearest railway station is now Worstead.

Through the 1960s Stalham's economy sank from a reduction of the agricultural labour force as a result of improvements in agricultural technology. Beginning in the 1970s, though, housing developments attracted people who took up residence in Stalham but worked elsewhere.

The Museum of the Broads moved to Stalham in 2000 and is situated on Stalham Staithe. It 'aims to bring the history of the Broads alive for locals and visitors to Norfolk' and is open to the public throughout the summer.

In 2002 Tesco built a supermarket in Stalham, with considerable controversy, with many residents fearing that it would "kill the high street". Despite this, the High Street contains a wide range of independent traders.

Governance
Stalham is part of the electoral ward of Stalham and Sutton. The total population of this ward at the 2011 Census was 4,312.

See also
Hunsett Windmill
Stalham High School

References

 
Towns in Norfolk
North Norfolk
Market towns in Norfolk
Civil parishes in Norfolk